Aleth Guzman-Nageotte (1904, Burgundy – 1978, Paris) was a French sculptor and medalist.

She studied at the School of Fine Arts of Dijon under the direction of  before joining the École nationale supérieure des beaux-arts of Paris in the workshops of Henri-Auguste Patey and Paul-Marcel Dammann for engraving and François-Léon Sicard and Henri Bouchard for sculpture.

Guzman-Nageotte won first prize of the Prix de Rome for engraving on medals in 1929.

References

External links 
 Guzman (Aleth) : la Syrie, SFAM, n° 6, s.d. (c.1934) Paris on inumis. com
 

20th-century French sculptors
20th-century engravers
French engravers
École des Beaux-Arts alumni
Prix de Rome for engraving
1904 births
1978 deaths
Burials at Montparnasse Cemetery